is the first opening theme song of the 1980s anime Fist of the North Star, performed by Japanese rock band , with the verses sung by Monsieur Yoshisaki and the chorus by Masayuki Tanaka.  The original B-side for the single was the first ending theme of Fist of the North Star titled . The song is known for the refrain , which is sometimes used as an alternate title for the song.

"Ai o Torimodose!!" is featured as an extra "special BGM" in the PlayStation 2 version of the multiplatform Jissen PachiSlot Hisshohou! Hokuto no Ken video game and is also used as the opening for the 2005 Sega-Sammy arcade game.

Mixed Martial Artist Josh Barnett used the song as an entrance theme in PRIDE Fighting Championships.

The song has been covered by multiple artists, including Animetal on Animetal Marathon IV and Decade of Bravehearts. Most recently, Hiromi Konno as Akira Kogami and Minoru Shiraishi as himself covered "Ai o Torimodose!!" under the name  for the theme song of the Lucky Star OVA.

In addition, both Yoshisaki (performing as Crystal King) and Tanaka have released self covers of "Ai o Torimodose!!". This began with Yoshisaki in 2004 on a single with the theme of Lupin III as the B-side and another single later in 2004 of remixes of "Ai o Torimodose!!" with "Yuria... Towa ni" as the B-side. He later released another version of the single in 2006 titled "Ai o Torimodose!! (Movie ver.)" (with a version of "Yuria... Towa ni" as the B-side) for the Legend of Raoh film. Tanaka's release of "Ai o Torimodose!! SPECIAL-EDITION" later in 2006 included "Yuria... Towa ni" as a B-side as well as the opening theme of Fist of the North Star 2 "TOUGH BOY" performed by TOM. A heavy metal arrangement of the song is featured on the Fist of the North Star: Ken's Rage soundtrack.

References

Anisong Database

Anime soundtracks
Fist of the North Star
Lucky Star (manga)
1984 songs